Dicellurata is a suborder of two-pronged bristletails in the order Diplura. There are at least 4 families and more than 170 described species in Dicellurata.

Families
These four families belong to the suborder Dicellurata:
 Dinjapygidae Womersley, 1939
 Heterojapygidae
 Japygidae Lubbock, 1873 (forcepstails)
 Parajapygidae Womersley, 1939

References

Further reading

 

Diplura